Ali Rıza Sergen Yalçın (born 5 November 1972), known as Sergen Yalçın, is a Turkish football commentator, coach and former international footballer who played as a midfielder.

Coming through the Beşiktaş Youth Infrastructure which he entered at the age of 10, he broke into the first team for which he played for 15 years. He said that Serpil Hamdi Tüzün, who watched Sergen for 15 seconds and brought him to Beşiktaş, drew 10 goal positions every day in line with his directive and applied them. He took part in the squad which was the "Undefeated Champion" in the 1991–92 1.Lig.  In 1997, he transferred to Istanbulspor with a record transfer fee.  Wearing the uniform of the four largest in Turkey is the first of the two players. In 2000, The Guardian newspaper said, "He has an invaluable left foot, he can even put the ball in an ashtray 60 meters away." He also stated that Newcastle United coach Bobby Robson was a fan of Sergen Yalçın. In his album "On the Bosphorus" by jazz musician Önder Focan, he was inspired by producing "Negres" (reverse Sergen).

Returned to Beşiktaş in 2002. Beşiktaş's top goal scorer of the squad which, became the champion in its 100th year. In the match played between Beşiktaş and Galatasaray in the 33rd week of the season, he scored the goal that brought the 100th year championship, and he realized the classic saying of Ercan Taner; "Sergen scored, championship came". He was selected as one of the best footballers of 100 years in 2003 as a result of the votes cast by the directors, media representatives and fans who were members of the Board of Directors, and the Board of Directors at Beşiktaş JK. In 2003 Player of the Year in Turkey has been selected. October 1, 2003 Chelsea-Besiktas in the Champions League group game Sergen Yalcin's 2 goals led the throw to break a lot of records Besiktas and Turkey. In the 2003-04 season, with the Beşiktaş shirt, he got close to the penalty bow against Çaykur Rizespor with the ball he won from the back of the middle field and completed with a scoring goal with İlhan Mansız, he won the "Goal of the Year" award. He came to Besiktas in 2002 and left in 2006. He became one of the rare midfielder players, who exceeded 100 goals in the league. From the British press, in September 2017 These Football Times published an article entitled "Sergen Yalçın: The man who could have been the world's best." He is the coach of Beşiktaş JK. He became the first name to become a champion in the Süper Lig as a football player and coach in Beşiktaş.

Childhood and early years
Ali Rıza Sergen Yalçın opened his eyes to the world as the first child of Günsel-Özer Yalçın couple in Kilyos town of Istanbul on November 5, 1972. Two more brothers, first Gürsoy and then Volkan, were born after him. He met football before he went to school on the beaches of Kilyos. Like Sergen, father Özer Yalçın was a footballer and he soon realized his son's interest in football and his special talent at the age of children. Taking to Beşiktaş for the auditions, Özer Yalçın entrusts the little Sergen to the palms of Serpil Hamdi Tuzun. However, Özer Yalçın, who was working at the hotel at that time, took Sergen to training. Later, little Sergen, who started secondary school, starts to go and come on his own.

Club career

Sergen began at Beşiktaş JK in 1991, and quickly became renowned for his skill and creativity. His first spell at the club saw him score 46 goals in 158 games – no mean feat for a midfielder. However, it was known that Sergen lacked professionalism. After a 4–1 defeat to Samsunspor, he was publicly criticised by the Beşiktaş deputy president due to his careless lifestyle. Sergen responded to the club official by insulting him.

Subsequently, Beşiktaş imposed a club-record fine of over £150,000. He was later forgiven after apologising but the fine stayed. Sergen then demanded a new and improved contract which was denied by the board.

As expected, Sergen departed from the club and became Turkey's record signing when he moved to İstanbulspor for £5.5m in 1997. Thereafter, Sergen now desired a move to the European fields and began contract negotiations with Internazionale and AC Milan. Terms could not be met with the Italian giants. After struggling with his weight due to months of inaction, İstanbulspor failed to offload him, so Jet-Pa (a sports company) bought his contract and arranged a loan deal with Fenerbahçe, which involved him wearing a personalised shirt promoting the company.

Under the coaching firstly from Joachim Löw and Rıdvan Dilmen, he seemed to have buckled down to the task. But when Zdenek Zeman took over, Sergen was consistently engaged in trench warfare. Sergen publicly criticised Zeman for trying to play him on the wing, which he believed was not his best position, and was accused of faking injury to avoid training sessions. Along with many other incidents, the final straw came with the home game against Bursaspor. When he eventually came on as a substitute, Sergen missed a simple scoring chance, which many of the fans believe to have been a deliberate miss as an act of protest or just pure spite. In the late stages of the game, with the score locked at 2–2, he further infuriated the supporters by strolling across to take a corner as though he had all the time in the world. Midway through the 1999–2000 season, Sergen had his contract terminated by Fenerbahçe. Due to his terrific individual showings for the national team, Sergen attracted attention from several foreign clubs. There were speculations about a move to FC Barcelona, Bayern Munich or Borussia Dortmund.

Despite heavy speculation, he finished the season at arch-rivals Galatasaray SK and displayed impressive showings to help Galatasaray do the domestic double. Sergen signed for the club too late in the season to be eligible for the UEFA Cup campaign, and as Galatasaray made the trip to Leeds for the second tie of the semi-final, Sergen was instructed to report to training in Istanbul. But instead of continuing his training in Istanbul, he took a little trip of his own to Northern Cyprus. While casinos were banned on the Turkish mainland, they remained open in Northern Cyprus which attracted quite a lot of gambling trade from Turkey. It attracted Sergen for precisely that reason and he spent much of his brief stay there in a casino. When he returned to Istanbul, he told manager Fatih Terim he was tired from the journey and asked if he could skip a training session. Terim is a fearsome disciplinarian and the reaction was predictably explosive. Sergen skipped title celebrations after the Galatasaray board made it clear they would not have him back next season.

After Euro 2000, Sergen was on the verge of a transfer to Newcastle United, manager Bobby Robson being a long-time admirer. The deal fell through and he instead moved to Trabzonspor and became the first player to have represented the big four clubs in Turkey. Sergen had never yet played for a club outside Istanbul and it was believed that removing him from the distractions of the big city would do good for his appalling disciplinary record. Ironically, it was the most unsuccessful season of his career. At the season's end, Trabzonspor did not wish to extend his loan deal.

Fatih Terim gave up on him at Galatasaray. Zdenek Zeman could not work with him at Fenerbahçe. He publicly criticised former national coach Mustafa Denizli after Euro 2000. British coach Gordon Milne worked with him at Beşiktaş and he too despaired of trying to get Sergen – and his magical left foot to the training ground on time. It was thought to be the end of Sergen Yalcin, the great enfant terrible of Turkish football.

Ahead of the 2001–2002 season, Galatasaray manager Mircea Lucescu took a gamble and signed Sergen on loan (still from Siirt-Jet). He cast Sergen as the natural successor to Gheorghe Hagi.
 The move was rewarded as Sergen repaid his manager's faith by starring in the UEFA Champions League with 2 goals and 2 assists as Galatasaray progressed to the second group stage. Unfortunately, Sergen tore his knee ligaments and would miss the rest of the season. He was told to lose weight or never play football again. After elimination from the UEFA Champions League, Lucescu remained insistent that if Sergen had remained fit, Galatasaray would have gone on to win the tournament. Galatasaray did still go on to win the league title.

In the 2002–2003 season, after years of wandering, Sergen returned home to Beşiktaş. Sergen was signed on a permanent deal by Lucescu, who had also moved to Beşiktaş. Under the tutelage of Lucescu, some whispered that, perhaps, the talent had been tamed. Sergen was finally maturing to fulfill some of his long-lost potential. Beşiktaş won the league, with Sergen the key instigator. The 2003–2004 season would see Beşiktaş' re-entry to the Champions League where Sergen was to feature in arguably the most memorable match of his career. Roman Abramovich became the owner of the English club, Chelsea FC, spending £112m on quality transfers. Chelsea's 'invincibles' were undefeated under the Abramovich-era ahead of the match with Beşiktaş, which was played at Stamford Bridge. With the odds stacked against them, Beşiktaş shocked the footballing world by winning 0–2, both goals courtesy of Sergen. Beşiktaş were eliminated in the group stage, but Sergen once again proved his class by scoring 2 goals and providing 3 assists in the six matches. He continued playing in Beşiktaş for another two years, becoming a fan-favourite of the club.

Before the 2006–2007 season, manager Jean Tigana did not see Sergen as part of his future plans and therefore, Beşiktaş terminated his contract with immediate effect. This enraged the fans, as Sergen was their greatest symbolic icon. Upon his departure, he stated that he would always be a Beşiktaş fan. He spent that season at lowly Etimesgut Şekerspor in the TFF Second League, before moving to Eskişehirspor of the TFF First League, retiring at the end of 2007–08 as his team achieved promotion to the top flight.

When Sergen was asked why he never moved to Europe, he simply replied, "If I was 20 again, I would leave Turkey within 3 days."

International career

Sergen played on the Turkey national under-23 football team at the 1993 Mediterranean Games, which they won by defeating France U21s in the semifinal and Algeria U23s in the final.

Sergen made his senior debut in a friendly game against F.Y.R. Macedonia in 1994. He would represent his nation in Euro 1996 and 2000, but injury prevented him from featuring at the FIFA World Cup in 2002. Sergen scored a total of 5 goals in 37 matches for the Turkish national team.

Euro 1996

Euro 1996 was Turkey's first tournament appearance since 1954. Sergen played a key role in qualification, scoring two goals. Sergen featured in two matches at the finals where they fell at the first hurdle, pointless and goalless. After the tournament, Sergen received several offers from the European shores, including the likes of West Ham United. Sergen's refusal to move was made by the fact the clubs in pursuit were not bigger than Beşiktaş.

FIFA World Cup 1998

Sergen was fairly inactive in the national team during this period. In the opening round of World Cup qualification, Sergen came on as a second-half substitute against Belgium. Sergen went from hero to villain in the space of five minutes by contriving to get himself sent off after initially scoring a splendid half-volley on the edge of the box. Turkey went on to lose the match 2–1 at Brussels. Manager Mustafa Denizli saw Sergen as a liability and did not select him for the next 13 months. Sergen's only other match during qualification was the 5–0 victory at San Marino, and Sergen was hugely disappointing. Turkey failed to make the finals.

Euro 2000

To his detractors, Sergen was a luxury item in a team which could ill afford luxuries. Those who had a fondness for decrying Sergen's abilities have suggested that, when playing at the highest level, he glitters rather than shines. So when Sergen was given a second chance, many lashed out at Denizli's decision to select him. Having finally accepted that he was the linchpin of his national side, Sergen dedicated himself to banish bitter memories of his past.

The opening match saw Sergen give a man of the match performance in a 3–0 victory over Northern Ireland, followed by a 1–0 victory against European champions Germany, but then shamefully defeated 1–3 to Finland. The next match against Moldova, Sergen was the maestro for the Turkish side, with his spectacular dribbling runs, shots at goal and his clairvoyant passes creating scoring chances for his teammates. It was from his corner kick that Turkey opened the scoring, and four minutes into injury time when Sergen took the stage, displacing the lead-footed Moldovan defenders one by one before slotting in a cracker from the edge of the area to give Turkey a 2–0 victory. Sergen also made history because his goal was the 400th scored in the history of the Turkish national team. Prior to the next match, Turkey had never defeated Finland in any official match since 1924. Outpaced and outplayed for 15 minutes, Turkey trailed 2–0 before Sergen intervened. The man of the match was involved in three goals as Turkey turned around a two-goal deficit to defeat Finland 2–4. Turkey gained five points from their final three matches to finish group runners-up. The final game with Germany ended 0–0, but is seen as one of the greatest individual displays in the history of the Turkish national team, as Sergen "pulled all the strings", according to the German manager Erich Ribbeck. As group runners-up, Turkey faced the Republic of Ireland in a play-off tie to qualify for Euro 2000. The Irish entered the match as favorites mainly due to their influential skipper, Roy Keane. In the first leg, Ireland could only do with a 1–1 draw in Dublin. Eamonn Sweeney of the Irish Examiner wrote the match report.

 The second leg ended 0–0, which was enough for Turkey to qualify through the away-goals rule. In the first 20 minutes of the second half alone, Sergen set up four clear scoring chances as he produced another man of the match performance.

Turkey opened their Euro 2000 campaign with a controversial 2–1 defeat to Italy. The Guardian writer Ian Ross recalled the game.

 It was his assist from a nicely flighted free-kick from which Turkey scored. Surprisingly, Sergen then came on as a substitute in their 0–0 draw with Sweden, and he didn't feature at all during the 2–0 victory over Belgium. In the quarter-finals, Sergen came on in the final few minutes as Turkey were defeated by Portugal. Sergen heavily criticised Denizli for not starting him in all of the matches, "He's got problems, he's not all there in the head. Don't ask me why I didn't play, ask him."

FIFA World Cup 2002
Sergen missed most of 2002 FIFA World Cup qualification due to his dismal performances at club level. His transfer to Galatasaray and performances in the UEFA Champions League allowed him back into the team and he featured in the 5–0 thrashing of Austria to qualify for the World Cup. Tragically though Sergen had injured himself prior to the tournament and did not feature.

Euro 2004

Sergen again wasn't involved in most of the Euro 2004 qualification campaign, but due to his memorable performance against Chelsea, he was selected for the crucial final qualifying match against England. It was his final match for Turkey, which ended 0–0. Due to injury, he did not feature in the play-off ties against Latvia as Turkey were defeated.

Managerial career
He has signed a contract with Gaziantepspor for one and a half year after former manager.
In 2021 Sergen returned to Besiktas as manager. He secured the Turkish Premier League title for Besiktas,completing his career first wins at the club.

Career statistics

Club

International
Scores and results list Turkey's goal tally first, score column indicates score after each Yalçın goal.

Managerial statistics

Honours

Player 
Beşiktaş
 Süper Lig: 1992, 1995, 2003 
 Turkish Cup: 1994, 2006 
 Turkish Super Cup: 1992, 1994 
 Prime Minister's Cup: 1997 
 TSYD Cup: 1993, 1996

Galatasaray
 Süper Lig: 2000, 2002
 Turkish Cup: 2000

 Turkey U-21 
 Mediterranean Games: 1993

Manager 
Beşiktaş
 Süper Lig: 2020–21
 Turkish Cup: 2020–21

Individual 
Player
 Süper Lig top assist provider: 2000 (14 assist)
 Beşiktaş silver 11 of the century: 2003
 Milliyet Sports Awards Player of the Year in Turkey: 2003
 Eminönü Belediyesi Century Footballer award: 2003

Manager
 Coach of the team that scored 5 goals in the first half of a match in the Süper Lig in Beşiktaş history.
 He became the first name to become a champion in the Süper Lig as a football player and coach in Beşiktaş.
 Coach of the team that scored the most goals in the Süper Lig in the history of Beşiktaş. (89 goal)

References

External links

 
 Mackolik.com
 These Football Times - THE MAN WHO COULD’VE BEEN THE WORLD’S BEST

1972 births
Living people
Footballers from Istanbul
Turkish footballers
Turkey international footballers
Turkey under-21 international footballers
Turkey youth international footballers
Association football midfielders
Beşiktaş J.K. footballers
İstanbulspor footballers
Eskişehirspor footballers
Fenerbahçe S.K. footballers
Trabzonspor footballers
Galatasaray S.K. footballers
Turanspor footballers
UEFA Euro 1996 players
UEFA Euro 2000 players
Süper Lig players
Turkish football managers
Süper Lig managers
Gaziantepspor managers
Sivasspor managers
Kayserispor managers
Eskişehirspor managers
Konyaspor managers
Alanyaspor managers
Yeni Malatyaspor managers
Beşiktaş J.K. managers
Mediterranean Games gold medalists for Turkey
Competitors at the 1993 Mediterranean Games
Mediterranean Games medalists in football